Thomas Reibey (24 September 1821 – 10 February 1912) was an Australian politician and Premier of Tasmania from 20 July 1876 until 9 August 1877.

Reiby was born in Hadspen, Van Diemen's Land, (now Tasmania) the son of Thomas Haydock Reibey and Richarda Allen, and a grandson of Mary Reibey. Reibey was educated at Trinity College, Oxford. His father died before he graduated and he returned to Tasmania.
In 1843 Reiby was admitted to Holy Orders by Bishop Francis Nixon. He was for some years rector of Holy Trinity church, Launceston, and afterwards rector of Carrick, where he built and partly endowed a church. About 1858 he became archdeacon of Launceston.

Missions to the islands of Bass Strait

Archdeacon Reibey was one of a number of the Anglican clergy in Tasmania who voyaged to the Bass Strait islands in the middle of the 19th century to minister to the spiritual needs of the islanders of Aboriginal descent. The first such voyage seems to have been that made by Bishop Francis Nixon in 1854.

The next such voyage, for which a record survives, was made by archdeacon Reibey in 1862. He was joined on the voyage by another cleric from northern Tasmania, the Reverend John Fereday (1813-1871) of George Town. They departed George Town on 17 March 1862, aboard a cutter of 10 tons with a crew of two seamen. During the cruise they called at Flinders Island and then Chappell Island, where the islanders had gathered from their various home islands for the annual mutton-bird harvest. When archdeacon Reibey conducted divine service here on Sunday, 23 March 1862, he had a congregation of over sixty people. Nine children were baptised during the service. Reibey and Fereday also visited Badger Island where they met Lucy Beadon. Archdeacon Reibey made subsequent voyages to the islands in 1862 and 1866. Cannon Marcus Brownrigg followed his example and made a series of similar voyages between 1872 and 1885.

Political career
Reibey entered the Tasmanian House of Assembly as member for Westbury in 1874 and continued to represent it for 29 years. From March 1875 to July 1876 he was leader of the opposition and then became premier and colonial secretary. But parties were not clearly defined, there was much faction, and his ministry lasted only a little more than a year. He was again leader of the opposition from August 1877 to December 1878 when he became colonial secretary in the William Crowther ministry until October 1879. In July 1887 he was elected speaker of the house of assembly and competently filled the position until July 1891. He was minister without portfolio in the Edward Braddon ministry from April 1894 to October 1899.

Four years later Reibey retired from politics and confined his interests to country pursuits for the remainder of his long life. He had two estates and kept a stud of horses which he raced purely for the love of sport. In 1882 he won the Launceston Cup and had just failed to win the Melbourne Cup with Stockwell —  he bought Malua as a yearling, which won the Melbourne Cup in 1884. He retired from racing towards the end of his life on account of his disapproval of some incidents that had occurred in connection with it. He was president of more than one racing club and gave much energy to the improvement of agriculture as president of the Northern Agricultural Society. Keeping his faculties to the end he died aged 90 on 10 February 1912. He married in 1842 Catherine McDonall, daughter of James Kyle of Inverness, who predeceased him. He had no children.

References

Peter Bolger, 'Reibey, Thomas (1821 - 1912)', Australian Dictionary of Biography, Volume 6, MUP, 1976, p. 17. Retrieved 17 October 2012
 The Mighty Malua

Further reading
 Blomfield, Henry Wilson.(1870) A full report of the great libel case, Reibey v. Blomfield : tried at the Supreme Court, Launceston, before His Honor Sir Francis Smith, Knt., Chief Justice, June 1870. Launceston [Tas.] : Printed and published by Harris and Just, [1870] The Great libel case, Reibey v. Blomfield.

1821 births
1912 deaths
Premiers of Tasmania
Speakers of the Tasmanian House of Assembly
Members of the Tasmanian House of Assembly
Leaders of the Opposition in Tasmania
Australian clergy
Anglican archdeacons in Tasmania
19th-century Australian politicians